Next Stop, Greenwich Village is a 1976 American comedy-drama film written and directed by Paul Mazursky, featuring Lenny Baker, Shelley Winters, Ellen Greene, Lois Smith, and Christopher Walken.

Plot
The film takes place in 1953. Larry Lipinsky is a 22-year old Jewish man from Brownsville in Brooklyn, New York, with dreams of stardom. He moves to Greenwich Village, much to the chagrin of his extremely overprotective mother. Larry ends up hanging out with an eccentric bunch of characters while waiting for his big break. He has a group of tight-knit friends, which includes a wacky girl named Connie; Anita, an emotionally distraught woman who constantly contemplates suicide; Robert, a young WASP who fancies himself a poet; and Bernstein, an African-American gay man. All the while, he tries to maintain a stormy relationship with Sarah, his girlfriend. This band of outsiders becomes Larry's new family as he struggles as an actor and works toward a break in Hollywood.

Cast
 Lenny Baker as Larry Lapinsky
 Shelley Winters as Fay Lapinsky
 Ellen Greene as Sarah
 Lois Smith as Anita
 Christopher Walken as Robert (as Chris Walken)
 Antonio Fargas as Bernstein
 Mike Kellin as Ben Lapinsky
 Lou Jacobi as Herb
 Dori Brenner as Connie
 Jeff Goldblum as Clyde Baxter
 Rashel Novikoff as Mrs. Tupperman
 Michael Egan as Herbert Berghof, Acting Coach
 Bill Murray (uncredited) as Nick Kessler
 Joe Spinell as Cop At El Station
 Stuart Pankin (uncredited) as Man At Party
 Vincent Schiavelli (uncredited) as Man At Rent Party
 Rochelle Oliver as Dr. Marsha

Production
Filmmaker Mazursky had made his acting debut in Stanley Kubrick's 1953 film Fear and Desire, and Next Stop, Greenwich Village is a semi-autobiographical account of Mazursky's early life as an actor.

The film was entered into the 1976 Cannes Film Festival.

Paul Mazursky discusses the making of this film in an interview published in Filmmakers Newsletter April, 1976, Volume 9, Number 6, pp. 30ff by Nicholas Pasquariello

Casting
This film is also notable for being Bill Murray's first film, with Murray having a few minutes of screen time. Jeff Goldblum and Christopher Walken (credited as Chris Walken) were early in their careers.

Reception
The film generally was well received by critics. Rotten Tomatoes gave the film a "fresh" score of 84% based on 19 reviews.

References

External links
 
 
 

1976 films
1970s coming-of-age comedy-drama films
1970s romantic comedy-drama films
20th Century Fox films
American coming-of-age comedy-drama films
American romantic comedy-drama films
Films about actors
Films about Jews and Judaism
Films directed by Paul Mazursky
Films scored by Bill Conti
Films set in 1953
Films set in Manhattan
Films shot in New York City
Greenwich Village
1970s English-language films
1970s American films